Vega Alta is a small town in Camajuaní, Villa Clara, Cuba and a Ward (consejo popular). It is in the vicinity of the Sagua la Chica River, with neighboring towns such as Canoa, Chicharón, Rincón, La Levisa, La Luz, La Catalina, La Doncella, and El Cubano.

”Vega Alta” translates to “high valley” in English.

Geography 

The Vega Alta’s ward is a local body of Vega Alta and towns nearby.

Towns in Vega Alta’s ward include:
 Rincón
 Chicharón
 La Levisa
 El Cubano (or La Flora)
 CPA Benito Ramírez
 Guerrero
 San Juan
 La Doncella
 La Lorenza

Nearby places that are north, northeast, east, southeast, south, southwest, west, and northwest of the town are:

  Farmland  Canoa    Rincón  Farmland    Farmland  Farmland      La Luz   Carmita

Park of Vega Alta
The Park of the town of Vega Alta (Parque del poblado de Vega Alta) shorten to the park of Vega Alta is the only park in Vega Alta, is it about 850 m2. It's one of 4 places in Camajuani which has free WiFi.

El Cubano
El Cubano also known as La Flora is a small town in Vega Alta’s ward.

History
Three months after the Ten Years' War started fighting broke out in Remedios. On February 14, 1869, a Venezuelan named Salomé Hernández, who was working for Dos Hermanos de los Fusté Suger Mill, got armed and took some slaves from the Ingenio. Salomé and her troops were aimed at burning sugar mills in El Cubano and other towns nearby.

Government 
Camajuaní has multiple Constituency Delegate (Delegado Circunscripción) for every ward, Vega Alta’s ward has: 

 Constituency Delegate #58  Raúl Águila Camacho
 Constituency Delegate #59 Santos Rodríguez González
 Constituency Delegate #60 Julio P. Hurtado Jaramillo
 Constituency Delegate #61 Fidel Fernández Mederos
 Constituency Delegate #66 Lázaro Rodríguez Gómez

Education

 Benito Ramírez Rodríguez in CPA Benito Ramírez
 Juan Francisco Aro in the main town of Vega Alta 
 Serafín Sánchez Valdivia in Guerrero
 Rolando Vera Martínez in Guajén
 Boris Luis Santa Coloma in La Lorenza
 Wilfredo Cabrera Portal in the main town of Vega Alta

History
Vega Alta was founded in 1883 when the families of Rafael Pérez Borroto, Don Vicente Revuelta and Manuela Rodríguez settled there.

In the Cuban War of Independence the bridge from Vega Alta to Canoa and Tuinicú got destroyed.  

Until 1976 Vega Alta was a part of the former San Antonio de las Vueltas Municipality.

Demographics

Economy 
According at the DMPF of Camajuani, Vega Alta is a settlement linked to sources of employment or economic development.

See also
 Aguada de Moya, Cuba
 La Quinta, Cuba
 José María Pérez, Cuba
 Chorrerón, Cuba

References

Villa Clara Province
Populated places in Villa Clara Province
1883 establishments in North America
1883 establishments in the Spanish Empire

ht:Vega Alta, Villa Clara